Zhytomyr Oblast, also referred to as Zhytomyrshchyna is an oblast (province) of northern Ukraine. The administrative center of the oblast is the city of Zhytomyr.

History
The oblast was created as part of the Ukrainian Soviet Socialist Republic on September 22, 1937, out of territories of Vinnytsia and Kyiv oblasts as well as two border okrugs of Kyiv Oblast – Korosten Okrug and Novohrad-Volynsky Okrug.

The oblast covers territories of the historic regions of Polesia, Volhynia, and Podolia, which are reflected on the oblast's coat of arms.

Before the 18th century bigger half of the oblast belonged to the Kyiv Voivodeship, while smaller western half around the city of Zviahel belonged to the Volyn Voivodeship. Following the treaty of Andrusovo, the city of Zhytomyr continued to act as an administrative center of the Kyiv Voivodeship.

Following the second partition of Poland, on the newly annexed territory was formed oversized Izyaslav Vice-royalty which included former Polish territories in Volhynia, Podolia, and Kyiv land and centered in Izyaslav. However a couple of years later the Russian Empire annexed more territories of the Polish Kingdom during the third partition of Poland contributing to the complete disappearance of the Polish statehood. The Izyaslav Vice-royalty was reformed and the territory of today's Zhytomyr Oblast predominantly ended up in the Russian Volhynian Governorate and the city of Zviahel which was renamed as Novohrad-Volynskyi became its administrative center. Later the administrative center was transferred to the bigger city of Zhytomyr.

During the 2022 Russian invasion of Ukraine Russian troops partly occupied the region.

Geography

Among the points of interest it is important to mention the following sites that were nominated for the Seven Wonders of Ukraine:
 Church of Saint Basil the Great (Ovruch)
 Stone village state preserve
 Korolev Memorial Astronautical Museum

The Museum of Ukrainian home icons, which is the only one in Europe, is situated in Zhytomyr Oblast. The museum is the part of the Radomysl Castle historical and cultural complex. It was founded by Olga Bogomolets.

Population
The current estimated population of the oblast is 1,268,903 (as of 2013). Zhytomyr Oblast is the most important center of the Polish minority in Ukraine, which numbers 49,000 locally.

Age structure
 0-14 years: 15.8%  (male 103,194/female 97,617)
 15-64 years: 68.1%  (male 420,285/female 444,803)
 65 years and over: 16.1%  (male 65,301/female 138,472) (2013 official)

Median age
 total: 39.4 years 
 male: 36.1 years 
 female: 42.6 years  (2013 official)

Economy

The economy of Zhytomyr Oblast mostly deals with mining of granite and other construction stone, forestry, agriculture and various machinery manufacturing.

The northern part of the province is highly affected by the Chernobyl disaster: some of the towns and raions are devastated and are included in the Chernobyl zone, while others are prohibited from producing their own agriculture.

Administrative divisions

Zhytomyr Oblast is subdivided into 4 raions (districts).

The districts of Zhytomyr oblast include:
 Berdychiv Raion (translit. Berdychivs’kyi raion)
 Korosten Raion (translit. Korostens’kyi raion)
 Zviahel Raion (translit. Zviahel’kyi raion)
 Zhytomyr Raion (translit. Zhytomyrs’kyi raion)

Important cities and settlements

List of biggest populated places of Zhytomyr Oblast with population in thousands:
 Zhytomyr – 266.9
 Berdychiv – 76.2
 Korosten – 63.5
 Zviahel – 56.3
 Malyn – 26.2
 Korostyshiv – 25.4
 Ovruch – 15.8
 Radomyshl – 14.6
 Baranivka – 11.8
 Olevsk – 10.5

Nomenclature

Most of Ukraine's oblasts are named after their capital cities, officially referred to as "oblast centers" (translit. oblasnyi tsentr). The name of each oblast is a relative adjective, formed by adding a feminine suffix to the name of respective center city: Zhytomyr is the center of  the Zhytomyrs'ka oblast''' (Zhytomyr Oblast). Most oblasts are also sometimes referred to in a feminine noun form, following the convention of traditional regional place names, ending with the suffix "-shchyna", as is the case with Zhytomyr Oblast, Zhytomyrshchyna''.

References

External links

  Zhytomyrschyna Welcomes{en}
 The Official Site of the Radomysl Castle

 
Oblasts of Ukraine
States and territories established in 1937
1937 establishments in Ukraine
Belarus–Ukraine border